Gulnora Alimova (born in Tashkent ) is an Uzbekistani pianist.

Alimova was awarded 2nd prizes at the 1993 Cidade do Porto, 1996 Cidade de Ferrol, 2004 Mannheim's Beethoven and, most notably, 1997 Cleveland competitions.

References
Mannheim's Hochschule für Musik und Darstellende Kunst Mannheim

Living people
1971 births
Uzbekistani classical pianists
Musicians from Tashkent
Cleveland International Piano Competition prize-winners
21st-century classical pianists
Women classical pianists